James Ashley Hoskin (born 27 March 1968) is an English former professional footballer who played as a winger.

Hoskin scored in the 1987–88 Football League Trophy Northern Area final second leg against Preston North End but was not played in the final against Wolverhampton Wanderers at Wembley Stadium.

Hoskin was the development and reserve team coach for Burnley for season 2010–11 but left on 13 May.

In May 2015 he was appointed manager of Colwyn Bay, having previously held coaching roles at Burnley and Bury.

References

1968 births
Living people
People from Accrington
English footballers
Association football midfielders
Burnley F.C. players
English Football League players
Accrington Stanley F.C. non-playing staff
Bury F.C. non-playing staff
Burnley F.C. non-playing staff
Colwyn Bay F.C. managers
English football managers